The Nokia 2700 classic is a Nokia quad-band GSM cell phone. It has a camera, FM radio, bluetooth connectivity, multimedia playback, and several internet-based applications (web browser, e-mail client, and instant messaging). It is assembled in Romania.

Technical specifications

Hardware Specifications
 CPU 500Mhz ARM processor
 64MB RAM, 64MB ROM (32MB User storage), 2MB JVM
 Supports up to 2GB SDcard (as of 2009), max. memory support up to 16GB (as of 2017)
 Multimedia Playback support Hardware (music and video)
 5 way Multi-Navi Key support (for multityping)
 240x320 LCD Display

Key features
 2MP Digital camera Landscape Mode(1600×1200 px), Portrait Mode (1200×1600 px), and video recorder (176×144 px)
 MP3, ringtones and user-recorded ringtones(.Wave Files) (Voice Recorder)
 FM radio
 Bluetooth 2.0 (for J2ME)
 SMS, MMS, email, and Nokia Xpress Audio Messaging (available in earlier models of Nokia 2700C) -- speech recognition was available on selected models only.
 32 MB internal dynamic memory, microSD memory card slot with hot swap, max. 16 GB

Operating frequency
 Quad Band GSM 850/900/1800/1900

Dimensions
 Volume: 62 cc
 Weight: 85 g (with battery)
 Length: 109.2 mm
 Width: 46 mm
 Thickness: 14 mm

Display
 2 inch, 262,144 colors TFT display, 240×320 pixels

Imaging
 2 MP Camera (1600×1200, 176×144 video)

Multimedia
 Graphics accelerated for 3D games: OPEN GL ES 1.1
 Camera (photo and video recorder) 2 MP
 Video player (AMR, AMR-WB, MIDI, MXMF, MP3, AAC, MP4/M4A/3GP/3GA (AAC, AAC+, eAAC+, AMR, AMR-WB), X-Tone, WAV (PCM, a-law, mu-law, ADPCM), WMA (WMA9, WMA10)
 Video player (174×144 3GP) (320 x 240 [mp4]}
 Voice recorder
 FM radio with RDS support

Messaging
 Email supports POP3, IMP4 and SMTP protocols
 Nokia XpressAudio Messaging (sends greetings with short voice clips)
 SMS text messages
 MMS messaging with pictures
 Saving the messages

Java applications
 MMS 1.3 (supports 595 KB size)
 Nokia Xpress Audio Messaging tiit
 Facebook 3.2 lite
 Opera 4.2 (upgradable to 8.1)
 UC browser 9.5
 Games Rally 3D, Snake III, Diamond Rush & Sudoku
 Google maps 2.3v
 Install Java 2.1 apps.

Connectivity
 Photo and data sharing with Bluetooth 2.0 and USB 2.0

Browsing
 Opera Mini 4.2 browser (upgradeable to 8.1)
 UC Browser 7.1 browser (upgradable to 9.5)

Power management
 Battery: BL-5C
 Capacity: 1020 mAh 
 Talk time: Up to 6 hrs 25 mins

Sales package contents
 Nokia 2700 classic
 Nokia battery BL-5C
 Nokia 1 x 1 GB microSD
 Nokia Stereo Headset WH-102
 Nokia Compact Charger AC-3
 User Guide

Operating system
 Nokia UI 9.95v
 OS : MIDP 2.1 CLDC 1.1 Series 40 v5 
 Java certified: SUN JAVA Microsystems edition and JVM (Java virtual memory)

References

External links
 9632822754 kuti
 

2700